Dr. Samuel Guthrie House is a historic home located at Hounsfield in Jefferson County, New York.  The home comprises a rectangular two-story, five-by-two-bay, brick Federal style core building and a rectangular one-story rear wing.  The rear wing is in three sections: a section constructed around 1822, an addition from the early 20th century, and a third from about 1910.

It was listed on the National Register of Historic Places in 1989.

References

Houses on the National Register of Historic Places in New York (state)
Federal architecture in New York (state)
Houses in Jefferson County, New York
Houses completed in 1818
National Register of Historic Places in Jefferson County, New York